Kid Rodelo is a 1966 western film directed by Richard Carlson and starring Don Murray, Janet Leigh and Broderick Crawford. Based on a novel by Louis L'Amour, it was a co-production between Spain and the United States. Shooting took place in Spain around Alicante and the capital Madrid.

Plot
After serving time in prison, a cowboy searches for fifty thousand dollars in gold.

Cast
Don Murray as Kid Rodelo
Janet Leigh as Nora
Broderick Crawford as Joe Harbin
Richard Carlson as Link
Jose Nieto as Thomas Reese
Miguel del Castillo as Chavas
Jose Villasante as Cavalry Hat
Julio Peña as Balsas
Mike Brendel

References

Bibliography
 Pitts, Michael R. Western Movies: A Guide to 5,105 Feature Films. McFarland, 2012.

1966 Western (genre) films
1966 films
American Western (genre) films
Spanish Western (genre) films
Films based on American novels
1960s English-language films
Paramount Pictures films
Films based on works by Louis L'Amour
Films directed by Richard Carlson
Films shot in Spain
1960s American films